The 1932 All-Big Ten Conference football team consists of American football players selected to the All-Big Ten Conference teams chosen by various selectors for the 1932 Big Ten Conference football season.

All Big-Ten selections

Ends
 Paul Moss, Purdue (AP-1, UP-1)
 Ivy Williamson, Michigan (AP-1, UP-2)
 Sid Gillman, Ohio State (UP-1)
 Ted Petoskey, Michigan (AP-2, UP-2)
 Bradbury N. Robinson, III, Minnesota (AP-2)

Tackles
 Marshall Wells, Minnesota (AP-1, UP-1)
 Whitey Wistert, Michigan (AP-2, UP-1)
 Ted Rosequist, Ohio State (AP-1, UP-2)
 Bill Cassels, Chicago (AP-2)
 Dutch Fehring, Purdue (UP-2)

Guards
 Greg Kabat, Wisconsin (AP-1, UP-1)
 Joseph T. Gailus, Ohio State (AP-1, UP-2)
 John Letsinger, Purdue (AP-2, UP-2)
 Martin D. Varner, Ohio State (AP-2)

Centers
 Chuck Bernard, Michigan (AP-1, UP-1)
 John Oehler, Purdue (AP-2, UP-1 [guard])
 Parsons, Chicago (UP-2)

Quarterbacks
 Harry Newman, Michigan (AP-1, UP-1)
 Paul Pardonner, Purdue (AP-2)
 Pug Lund, Minnesota (UP-2) (CFHOF)

Halfbacks
 Gil Berry, Illinois (AP-1, UP-1)
 Lew Hinchman, Ohio State (AP-1, UP-1)
 Walter "Mickey" McGuire, Wisconsin (AP-2, UP-2)
 Duane Purvis, Purdue (AP-2, UP-2 [fb])
 Fred Hecker, Purdue (UP-2)

Fullbacks
 Roy Horstmann, Purdue (AP-1, UP-1)
 Jack Manders, Minnesota (AP-2)

Key
AP = Associated Press

UP = United Press

Bold = Consensus first-team selection of the AP and UP

See also
1932 College Football All-America Team

References

1932 Big Ten Conference football season
All-Big Ten Conference football teams